Sarishabari is an upazila of Jamalpur District in the Division of Mymensingh, Bangladesh.

Geography

It has 58,254 households and total area 263.48 km2. The upazila s bounded by Madarganj and Jamalpur sadar upazilas on the north, Bhuapur upazila on the south, Gopalpur and' Dhanbari upazilas the east, Sariakandi, Kazipur and Sirajganj sadar upazilas on the west.

Demographics
According to the 1991 Bangladesh census, Sarishabari had a population of 289,106. Males constituted 51.66% of the population, while females constituted 48.34% of the population. The population for the age 18 and up was 148,197. Sarishabari had an average literacy rate of 24.4% (7+ years), with a national average of 32.4% literacy rate.

According to the 2011 Bangladesh census, the total population of Sarishabari is 325,320, and houses 1,235 people per square kilometre, which is the highest in the Jamalpur district.

Administration
Sarishabari Thana was formed in 1960 and it was turned into an upazila in 1983.

Sarishabari Upazila is divided into Sarishabari Municipality and eight union parishads: Aona, Bhatara, Doail, Kamrabad, Mahadan, Pingna, Pogaldigha, and Satpoa. The union parishads are subdivided into 113 mauzas and 183 villages.

See also
Upazilas of Bangladesh
Districts of Bangladesh
Divisions of Bangladesh

References

 

Upazilas of Jamalpur District